Cathryn Mataga (born William Mataga) is a game programmer and founder of independent video game company Junglevision. Under the name William, she wrote Atari 8-bit family games for Synapse Software in the early to mid 1980s, including Shamus, a flip-screen shooter.

Career
Mataga designed the game Shamus in 1982, credited under the name William for the Atari 8-bit family. Much of the game's appeal was said to come from Mataga's sense of humor, such as creating a "grand rendition" of the Alfred Hitchcock theme song in the game's introduction. Mataga followed it with a sequel Shamus: Case II and scrolling shooter Zeppelin.

Steve Hales of Synapse Software, in an interview for the book Halcyon Days, states that he and Mataga convinced company founder Ihor Wolosenko to get the company into interactive fiction.

Mataga developed an interactive fiction programming language known as BtZ (Better than Zork) for Broderbund, in the early 1980s.  Mataga worked with Hales and poet Robert Pinsky on the interactive fiction game Mindwheel (1984).

Mataga was one of the programmers working at Stormfront Studios on the original Neverwinter Nights MMORPG. Don Daglow credits Mataga as one of the programmers who proved Daglow's assertion that he could make Neverwinter Nights a success.

Games
Shamus (1982), Synapse Software
Shamus: Case II (1983), Synapse Software
Zeppelin (1983), Synapse Software
Mindwheel (1984), Broderbund Software
Essex (1985), Broderbund
Brimstone (1985), Broderbund
Breakers (1986), Broderbund
Neverwinter Nights (1991), Strategic Simulations
Gateway to the Savage Frontier (1991), Strategic Simulations
Treasures of the Savage Frontier (1992), Strategic Simulations
Stronghold (1993), Strategic Simulations
Dark Sun Online: Crimson Sands (1996), Strategic Simulations
Rampage 2: Universal Tour (1999), Midway Games
X-Men: Reign of Apocalypse (2001), Activision
Spyro: Season of Ice (2001), Universal Interactive
Rayman (2001), Ubi Soft
Dragon's Lair (2001), Capcom
Grand Theft Auto Advance (2004), Rockstar Games
Spider-Man 2 (2004), Activision
Rayman: 10th Anniversary (2005), Ubisoft

References

External links
Jungle Vision
Cathryn Mataga profile on MobyGames

21st-century LGBT people
Dungeons & Dragons video game designers
Living people
Transgender women
Video game programmers
Women video game programmers
Year of birth missing (living people)